Petri Mór (11 July 1863 – 2 March 1945) was a teacher, school inspector and author in Transylvania.

His masterwork is Szilágy vármegye monographiája (I-IV, Budapest, 1901–1904).

Works 

 Szilágy vármegye monographiája (I-VI., Budapest, 1901–1904)
 Magyar szonettek (Budapest, 1933)
 Vándor a kertajtónál (versek, Budapest, 1936)
 Naplemente fáklyalángja (versek, Budapest, 1941)
 Várballadák és modern balladák (Budapest, 1943)
 A boldogság triolettjei (versek, Budapest, 1943)

Place names 

 Gymnasia School "Petri Mór" Nuşfalău.

External links 
 http://mek.oszk.hu/04700/04750/
 http://mek.niif.hu/00300/00355/html/ABC11587/12169.htm
 https://web.archive.org/web/20110423142209/http://www.netlexikon.hu/yrk/Ryrgenwm/11923

People from Tășnad
Hungarian journalists
Hungarian schoolteachers
20th-century Hungarian historians
Hungarian anthropologists
Hungarian sociologists
1863 births
1945 deaths
19th-century Hungarian educators
20th-century Hungarian educators
19th-century Hungarian writers
20th-century Hungarian writers